Marlene singt Berlin, Berlin is a Marlene Dietrich's studio album released in 1965. The album is Dietrich's homage to the city with which she's most often associated: Berlin. The design for the original cover was done by Marlene herself. Orchestrated and conducted by Burt Grund. Issued on Polydor (catalogue number 238102). Issued in the US by Capitol Records under the title, Marlene Dietrich's Berlin (Capitol ST 10443). Dietrich said this was her best album.

Track listing

References

1965 albums
German-language albums
Marlene Dietrich albums